An author is the writer of a book, article, play, or other written work. A broader definition of the word "author" states:

"An author is 'the person who originated or gave existence to anything' and whose authorship determines responsibility for what was created.'"

Typically, the first owner of a copyright is the person who created the work, i.e. the author. If more than one person created the work, then a case of joint authorship takes place. Copyright laws differ around the world. The United States Copyright Office, for example, defines copyright as "a form of protection provided by the laws of the United States (title 17, U.S. Code) to authors of 'original works of authorship.'"

Legal significance of authorship
Holding the title of "author" over any "literary, dramatic, musical, artistic, [or] certain other intellectual works" gives rights to this person, the owner of the copyright, especially the exclusive right to engage in or authorize any production or distribution of their work. Any person or entity wishing to use intellectual property held under copyright must receive permission from the copyright holder to use this work, and often will be asked to pay for the use of copyrighted material.

The copyrights on intellectual work expire after a certain time. It enters the public domain, where it can be used without limit. Copyright laws in many jurisdictions – mostly following the lead of the United States, in which the entertainment and publishing industries have very strong lobbying power – have been amended repeatedly since their inception, to extend the length of this fixed period where the work is exclusively controlled by the copyright holder. Technically, someone owns their work from the time it's created. A notable aspect of authorship emerges with copyright in that, in many jurisdictions, it can be passed down to another upon one's death. The person who inherits the copyright is not the author, but has access to the same legal benefits.

Intellectual property laws are complex. Fiction work involves trademark law, likeness rights, fair use rights held by the public (including the right to parody or satirize), and many other interacting complications.

Authors may portion out different rights they hold to different parties, at different times, and for different purposes or uses, such as the right to adapt a plot into a film, but only with different character names, because the characters have already been optioned by another company for a television series or a video game. An author may also not have rights when working under contract that they would otherwise have, such as when creating a work for hire (e.g., hired to write a city tour guide by a municipal government that totally owns the copyright to the finished work), or when writing material using intellectual property owned by others (such as when writing a novel or screenplay that is a new installment in an already established media franchise).

Philosophical views of the nature of authorship

In literary theory, critics find complications in the term author beyond what constitutes authorship in a legal setting. In the wake of postmodern literature, critics such as Roland Barthes and Michel Foucault have examined the role and relevance of authorship to the meaning or interpretation of a text.

Barthes challenges the idea that a text can be attributed to any single author. He writes, in his essay "Death of the Author" (1968), that "it is language which speaks, not the author." The words and language of a text itself determine and expose meaning for Barthes, and not someone possessing legal responsibility for the process of its production. Every line of written text is a mere reflection of references from any of a multitude of traditions, or, as Barthes puts it, "the text is a tissue of quotations drawn from the innumerable centers of culture"; it is never original. With this, the perspective of the author is removed from the text, and the limits formerly imposed by the idea of one authorial voice, one ultimate and universal meaning, are destroyed. The explanation and meaning of a work does not have to be sought in the one who produced it, "as if it were always in the end, through the more or less transparent allegory of the fiction, the voice of a single person, the author 'confiding' in us." The psyche, culture, fanaticism of an author can be disregarded when interpreting a text, because the words are rich enough themselves with all of the traditions of language. To expose meanings in a written work without appealing to the celebrity of an author, their tastes, passions, vices, is, to Barthes, to allow language to speak, rather than author.

Michel Foucault argues in his essay "What is an author?" (1969) that all authors are writers, but not all writers are authors. He states that "a private letter may have a signatory—it does not have an author." For a reader to assign the title of author upon any written work is to attribute certain standards upon the text which, for Foucault, are working in conjunction with the idea of "the author function." Foucault's author function is the idea that an author exists only as a function of a written work, a part of its structure, but not necessarily part of the interpretive process. The author's name "indicates the status of the discourse within a society and culture," and at one time was used as an anchor for interpreting a text, a practice which Barthes would argue is not a particularly relevant or valid endeavour.

Expanding upon Foucault's position, Alexander Nehamas writes that Foucault suggests "an author [...] is whoever can be understood to have produced a particular text as we interpret it," not necessarily who penned the text. It is this distinction between producing a written work and producing the interpretation or meaning in a written work that both Barthes and Foucault are interested in. Foucault warns of the risks of keeping the author's name in mind during interpretation, because it could affect the value and meaning with which one handles an interpretation.

Literary critics Barthes and Foucault suggest that readers should not rely on or look for the notion of one overarching voice when interpreting a written work, because of the complications inherent with a writer's title of "author." They warn of the dangers interpretations could suffer from when associating the subject of inherently meaningful words and language with the personality of one authorial voice. Instead, readers should allow a text to be interpreted in terms of the language as "author."

Relationship with publisher

Self-publishing

Self-publishing is a model where the author takes full responsibility and control of arranging financing, editing, printing, and distribution of their own work. In other words, the author also acts as the publisher of their work.

Traditional publishing
With commissioned publishing, the publisher makes all the publication arrangements and the author covers all expenses.

The author of a work may receive a percentage calculated on a wholesale or a specific price or a fixed amount on each book sold. Publishers, at times, reduced the risk of this type of arrangement, by agreeing only to pay this after a certain number of copies had sold. In Canada, this practice occurred during the 1890s, but was not commonplace until the 1920s. Established and successful authors may receive advance payments, set against future royalties, but this is no longer common practice. Most independent publishers pay royalties as a percentage of net receipts – how net receipts are calculated varies from publisher to publisher. Under this arrangement, the author does not pay anything towards the expense of publication. The costs and financial risk are all carried by the publisher, who will then take the greatest percentage of the receipts. See Compensation for more.

Vanity publishing

Vanity publishers normally charge a flat fee for arranging publication, offer a platform for selling, and then take a percentage of the sale of every copy of a book. The author receives the rest of the money made. Most materials published this way are for niche groups and not for large audiences.

Vanity publishing, or subsidy publishing, is stigmatized in the professional world. In 1983, Bill Henderson defined vanity publishers as people who would “publish anything for which an author will pay, usually at a loss for the author and a nice profit for the publisher.” In subsidy publishing, the book sales are not the publishers' main source of income, but instead the fees that the authors are charged to initially produce the book are. Because of this, the vanity publishers need not invest into making books marketable as much as other publishers need to. This leads to low quality books being introduced to the market.

Relationship with editor
The relationship between the author and the editor, often the author's only liaison to the publishing company, is often characterized as the site of tension. For the author to reach their audience, often through publication, the work usually must attract the attention of the editor. The idea of the author as the sole meaning-maker of necessity changes to include the influences of the editor and the publisher to engage the audience in writing as a social act. There are three principal kinds of editing – proofing (checking the grammar and spelling, looking for typographical errors), story (potentially an area of deep angst for both author and publisher), and layout (the typesetting needed to ready a work for publishing often requires minor text changes, so a layout editor is employed to ensure that these do not alter the sense of the text).

Pierre Bourdieu's essay "The Field of Cultural Production" depicts the publishing industry as a "space of literary or artistic position-takings," also called the "field of struggles," which is defined by the tension and movement inherent among the various positions in the field. Bourdieu claims that the "field of position-takings [...] is not the product of coherence-seeking intention or objective consensus," meaning that an industry characterized by position-takings is not one of harmony and neutrality. In particular for the writer, their authorship in their work makes their work part of their identity, and there is much at stake personally over the negotiation of authority over that identity. However, it is the editor who has "the power to impose the dominant definition of the writer and therefore to delimit the population of those entitled to take part in the struggle to define the writer". As "cultural investors," publishers rely on the editor position to identify a good investment in "cultural capital" which may grow to yield economic capital across all positions.

According to the studies of James Curran, the system of shared values among editors in Britain has generated a pressure among authors to write to fit the editors' expectations, removing the focus from the reader-audience and putting a strain on the relationship between authors and editors and on writing as a social act. Even the book review by the editors has more significance than the readership's reception.

Compensation 
Authors rely on advance fees, royalty payments, adaptation of work to a screenplay, and fees collected from giving speeches.

A standard contract for an author will usually include provision for payment in the form of an advance and royalties. An advance is a lump sum paid in advance of publication. An advance must be earned out before royalties are payable. An advance may be paid in two lump sums: the first payment on contract signing, and the second on delivery of the completed manuscript or on publication.

Royalty payment is the sum paid to authors for each copy of a book sold and is traditionally around 10–12%, but self-published authors can earn about 40% – 60% royalties per each book sale. An author's contract may specify, for example, that they will earn 10% of the retail price of each book sold. Some contracts specify a scale of royalties payable (for example, where royalties start at 10% for the first 10,000 sales, but then increase to a higher percentage rate at higher sale thresholds).

An author's book must earn the advance before any further royalties are paid. For example, if an author is paid a modest advance of $2000, and their royalty rate is 10% of a book priced at $20 – that is, $2 per book – the book will need to sell 1000 copies before any further payment will be made. Publishers typically withhold payment of a percentage of royalties earned against returns.

In some countries, authors also earn income from a government scheme such as the ELR (educational lending right) and PLR (public lending right) schemes in Australia. Under these schemes, authors are paid a fee for the number of copies of their books in educational and/or public libraries.

These days, many authors supplement their income from book sales with public speaking engagements, school visits, residencies, grants, and teaching positions.

Ghostwriters, technical writers, and textbooks writers are typically paid in a different way: usually a set fee or a per word rate rather than on a percentage of sales.

In the year 2016, according to the U.S. Bureau of Labor Statistics, nearly 130,000 people worked in the U.S. as authors, making an average of $61,240 per year.

See also
 Lead author
 Academic authorship
 Authors' editor
 Writing
 Distributive writing
 Professional writing
 Composition (language)
 Auteur
 Writer
 Poet
 Novelist
 Lists of writers
 Lists of poets
 List of novelists
Lesser-known authors

References

Writing occupations
Literary criticism